Vanderwulpia sequens is a species of bristle fly in the family Tachinidae.

Distribution
United States, Mexico.

References

Tachininae
Taxa named by Charles Henry Tyler Townsend
Diptera of North America
Insects described in 1892